The Friedrich Miescher Laboratory (FML) of the Max Planck Society is a biological research institute located on the Society's campus in Tübingen, Germany, named after Friedrich Miescher, founded in 1969 to offer highly qualified junior scientists in biology an opportunity to establish independent research groups and pursue their own line of research within a five-year period.
There are currently four research groups studying evolutionary genetics, systems biology of development, and the biochemistry of meiotic recombination.

Profile
The Friedrich Miescher Laboratory (FML) of the Max Planck Society is a biological research institute located on the Society's campus in Tübingen, Germany, named after Friedrich Miescher. It was founded in 1969 to offer highly qualified junior scientists in the area of biology an opportunity to establish independent research groups and pursue their own line of research within a five-year period.
 
The FML was a bold experiment by the Max Planck Society, in response to the brain drain, to place more resources in the hands of junior scientists and make Germany a more attractive research destination.

Group Leaders 
The group leaders are elected by a committee of scientists from diverse areas and institutions on the basis of a public tendering procedure.
 
Since 2005 the FML has been represented by a managing director in order to relieve the group leaders of administrative burdens and to allow them even more time to focus on their research.

There is no specification as to which kind of biological research should be conducted at the FML, and the focus of research changes with the appointment of each new group leader. While at the FML, they can use modern, well-equipped laboratories and work in teams tailored to their ideas. Each group leader is free to allocate their resources as they choose, and in addition there is a central budget for the FML, managed jointly by the group leaders.

References

External links
Friedrich Miescher Laboratory

Friedrich Miescher Laboratory
Biological research institutes
Tübingen